Vincent Akira Rabelais Carté is an American composer, poet, software programmer and experimental multimedia artist. He is most known for his 2004 record on Samadhi Sound, Spellewauerynsherde, as well as his experimental audio processing software Argeïphontes Lyre, and his works which take inspiration from magic realism.

Career and artistry
Rabelais began his career on the record label Ritornell, until in 2004 when David Sylvian signed him to his record label Samadhi Sound. In 2004, Rabelais released his now cult classic record Spellewauerynsherde to critical acclaim on the label. The record reportedly samples traditional Icelandic a cappella lament songs. It was reissued on multiple vinyl editions for the first time by Boomkat Editions in 2017.

In 2005, he was involved with tape manipulation on Björk's 'Bath', on her soundtrack for Matthew Barney's Drawing Restraint 9.

Rabelais has used his own experimental electroacoustic audio processing software, Argeïphontes Lyre, on many of his records. The software is notable for its intricate, often confusing layout which incorporates multimedia elements. Artists such as Terre Thaemlitz, Biosphere and Scanner have also used the software on their releases.

In February 2019, Rabelais released cxvi through Boomkat Editions, a 'years-in-the-making' album that features collaborations with Ben Frost, Stephan Mathieu, Kassel Jaeger, Biosphere, Mélanie Skriabine and Harold Budd among others. It is set to be described as his magnum opus, and features influences from early music, ASMR, classical music, sound design and shoegaze.

Discography
Studio albums
 Elongated Pentagonal Pyramid (1999, Ritornell)
 Eisoptrophobia (2001, Ritornell)
 ...Bénédiction, Draw. (2003, Ortholorng Musork)
 Spellewauerynsherde (2004, Samadhi Sound)
 A.M. Station (2005, En/Of)
 Hollywood (2008, Schoolmap)
 Caduceus (2010, Samadhi Sound)
 The Little Glass (2015, self-released)
 cxvi (2019, Boomkat Editions)
 Context in the Moment (2020, Boomkat Editions)
 À la recherche du temps perdu (2021, self-released)
 図書館 (2021, self-released)

References

Ambient musicians
American avant-garde musicians
American electronic musicians
American experimental musicians
American contemporary artists
American multimedia artists
American software engineers
Living people
1966 births